George Boyce may refer to:

George W. G. Boyce Jr. (1916–1944), United States Army officer and Medal of Honor recipient
George Price Boyce (1826–1897), British watercolour painter
George Boyce (Canadian politician) (1848–1930), Unionist MP for Carleton, 1917–1921
D. G. Boyce (D. George Boyce, 1942–2020), Northern Irish historian